Dehnow, Khorramabad may refer to:

Deh Now, Khorramabad, a village in Khorramabad County, Lorestan Province, Iran
Dehnow, Dehpir, a village in Dehpir Rural District, Central District, Khorramabad County, Lorestan Province, Iran
Deh-e Now, Qaedrahmat, a village in Qaedrahmat Rural District, Zagheh District, Khorramabad County, Lorestan Province, Iran
Deh-e Now, Zagheh, a village in Zagheh Rural District, Zagheh District, Khorramabad County, Lorestan Province, Iran